Back Home is a 1992 children's picture book by Gloria Jean Pinkney and illustrator Jerry Pinkney. Published in 1992 by Dial Press, it is about a young girl, Ernestine, who, with her family, visits the place she was born.

Reception
Booklist, in a review of Back Home, wrote "This is more a reminiscence than a plotted story, warm with Southern summer and family affection, a vignette of times gone by and roots rediscovered." and School Library Journal found it "more a reminiscence than a plotted story, warm with Southern summer and family affection, a vignette of times gone by and roots rediscovered." Publishers Weekly wrote "Gloria Pinkney's text has a relaxed pace that is perfectly suited to the summer setting. Her characterizations are particularly well drawn, and her dialogue thoroughly convincing. In some of Jerry Pinkney's finest work, sunlight filters through his pencil and watercolor illustrations, imbuing them with a feathery soft glow." 

Back Home has also been reviewed by Kirkus Reviews, The Horn Book Magazine, and the Smithsonian.

See also
The Sunday Outing

References

1992 children's books
American picture books
Dial Press books
Picture books by Jerry Pinkney